Vasile Louis Puscas (September 13, 1915 – October 3, 2009) was an American prelate of the Romanian Catholic Church.

Puscas was born in Aurora, Illinois and was ordained to the priesthood on May 14, 1942. He was appointed apostolic exarch  for the Romanian faithful of the Byzantine rite residing in the United States and was consecrated titular Bishop of Leuce on June 26, 1983. On March 26, 1987, Puscas was appointed bishop of the newly established Romanian Catholic Eparchy of St George's in Canton. Puscas retired from the pastoral governance of the eparchy on July 2, 1993, aged 77. On September 1, 1993, he left Canton for his hometown Aurora in Illinois, where he died on October 3, 2009.

See also
Saint George's in Canton (Romanian)

References
"Saint George's in Canton dei Romeni." Annuario Pontificio 2006, Città del Vaticano: Libreria Editrice Vaticana, 2006, p. 630.

External links
Catholic-Hierarchy
Diocese Site

20th-century Roman Catholic bishops in the United States
American Eastern Catholic bishops
Romanian Greek-Catholic bishops
American people of Romanian descent
1915 births
2009 deaths
People from Aurora, Illinois
People from Canton, Ohio